The Friedrichshafen FF.35 was a seaplane torpedo bomber built in Germany during World War I. Similar in general design to the Friedrichshafen G.I, it was a conventional four-bay biplane with unstaggered, unequal-span wings. The horizontal stabiliser was mounted halfway up the tail fin, and the undercarriage consisted of two widely spaced pontoons. The sole FF.35 was delivered to the German Navy for testing in May 1916 and was given the serial number 300. Although no further examples were built, the FF.35 formed the basis for the successful FF.41.

Specifications

References

Bibliography

Further reading
 

1910s German bomber aircraft
Floatplanes
FF.35
Biplanes
Twin piston-engined tractor aircraft
Aircraft first flown in 1916